Maria Minzenti or sometimes Maria Mindzenty (21 May 1898 – 19 April 1973) was an Austrian film actress.

Selected filmography
 The Duke of Reichstadt (1920)
 The Favourite of the Queen (1922)
 Meriota the Dancer (1922)
 The Separating Bridge (1922)
 The Path to God (1924)
 Venetian Lovers (1925)
 Mrs Worrington's Perfume (1925)
 A Song from Days of Youth (1925)
 The Adventurous Wedding (1925)
 Your Desire Is Sin (1925)
 Written in the Stars (1925)
 Our Emden (1926)
 Grandstand for General Staff (1926)
 The Seventh Son (1926)
 The Villa in Tiergarten Park (1927)
 The Page Boy at the Golden Lion (1928)
 What's Wrong with Nanette? (1929)
 When the Evening Bells Ring (1930)
 Judgment of Lake Balaton (1933)

References

Bibliography

External links

1898 births
1973 deaths
Austrian film actresses
Austrian silent film actresses
20th-century Austrian actresses
Actresses from Vienna